USS LST-826 was an  in the United States Navy. Like many of her class, she was not named and is properly referred to by her hull designation.

LST-826 was laid down on 6 October 1944 at Evansville, Indiana, by the Missouri Valley Bridge & Iron Co.; launched on 14 November 1944; sponsored by Mrs. W. E. Haynie; and commissioned on 7 December 1944.

Service history
During World War II, LST-826 was assigned to the Asiatic-Pacific theater and participated in the assault and occupation of Okinawa Gunto in May and June 1945. Following the war, she performed occupation duty in the Far East until early December 1945.

LST-826 was one of several ships grounded at Okinawa as a result of Typhoon Louise on 9 October 1945. In November 1945 the U.S. Chief of Naval Operations directed that the hulk be sunk or destroyed, but this was not done and she became one of around 15 wrecks that were finally sold in two batches in May and November 1947 by the State Department's Foreign Liquidations Commission.

LST-826 earned one battle star for World War II service.

References

 
 

 

LST-542-class tank landing ships
World War II amphibious warfare vessels of the United States
Ships built in Evansville, Indiana
1944 ships
Maritime incidents in October 1945
Shipwrecks in the Pacific Ocean